Parenchodus is a genus of prehistoric fish from the Late Cenomanian. The fossils are known from Kefar Shaul Formation Israel, and there are eight total specimens. It is home to one species longipterygius.

Description 
The genus is characterized by a short, high body, a fenestra-less premaxilla, and by the long and narrow postcleithrum reaching the ventral margin of the belly. Other characteristics are the axial skeleton with thirty vertebrae, of which only seven are abdominal; dorsal and anal fins with long bases; a ventral, well-developed pectoral fin; a naked body, devoid of scales except for two dorsal postoccipital and three lateral scutes at the base of the tail; and with a reduction and fusion of the endoskeletal elements of the caudal fin.

References

http://paleodb.org/cgi-bin/bridge.pl?action=checkTaxonInfo&taxon_no=35578&is_real_user=1

Prehistoric aulopiformes